The Rt Hon. Dame Dehra S. Parker, GBE, PC (NI) (13 August 1882 – 30 November 1963), was the longest serving female MP in the House of Commons of Northern Ireland.

Family life
Dehra Kerr-Fisher was born in a military hospital in Dehra Dun, north of Delhi, India, in 1882, the only child of James Kerr-Fisher and his wife Annie. Her father, a native of Kilrea, County Londonderry, was a successful financier. She was educated in the United States, where her father held extensive property holdings, and in Germany. The surname has been spelled, alternatively, as Ker-Fisher or Ker Fisher.

Marriages
She was married twice. Her first husband was Lieutenant-Colonel Robert Peel Dawson Spencer Chichester, MP (d.1921), with whom she had one son and one daughter, Robert James Spencer Chichester (1902–1920) and Marion Caroline Dehra Chichester (1904–1976). She was predeceased by her son. On 4 June 1928 she married her second husband, Admiral Henry Wise Parker (CB, CMG).

Political career
Dame Dehra was first elected as a Member of Parliament (MP) for Londonderry, as Dehra Chichester (as she was known prior to her second marriage in 1928), in the 1921 Northern Ireland general election. She stood down at the 1929 election just before her second marriage but was elected unopposed as Dehra Parker in the 15 March 1933 by-election for the South Londonderry constituency following the death of her son-in-law James Lenox-Conyngham Chichester-Clark, and served until her resignation on 15 June 1960. Her grandson, James Chichester-Clark, was elected unopposed at the subsequent by-election. He later served as the fifth Prime Minister of Northern Ireland from 1969 to 1971.

From her re-election in 1933 until her retirement in 1960, she faced opposition only once. During the 1949 Northern Ireland General Election, with anti-partition agitation a common theme across the region, she was opposed in South Londonderry by a Nationalist Party candidate, T.B. Agnew, whom she defeated. She was a Parliamentary Secretary to the Ministry of Education from 1 December 1937 to 15 March 1944. She was also Chair of the Northern Ireland General Health Services Board from 1948 to 1949. She served as Minister of Health and Local Government from 26 August 1949 to 13 March 1957 and became a member of the Privy Council of Northern Ireland in 1949. She was elevated to Dame Commander of the Order of the British Empire in the 1949 Birthday honours "for public services", having previously been appointed as an OBE, and was advanced to be a Dame Grand Cross of the Order of the British Empire (GBE) in 1957.

Her promotion to the Cabinet at the age of 67 under Sir Basil Brooke (later created The 1st Viscount Brookeborough) was part of his so-called 'reforming' premiership; his predecessor having been criticised for appointing elderly members to Cabinet. She was the first woman to serve in the Northern Ireland Cabinet.

Extra-Parliamentary activities
Outside of parliamentary activities, Dame Dehra was a long-serving local councillor on Magherafelt Rural District Council, president of both the Northern Ireland Physical Training Association and the Girls' Training Corps, and chairman of the Ancient Monuments Advisory Committee. In 1944, Parker was appointed senior vice-chairman of the Council for the Encouragement of Music and the Arts (CEMA NI), and in 1949 she succeeded Sir David Lindsay Keir as President for CEMA, a position she held until 1960.  Parker was made an honorary member of the Ulster Society of Women Artists in 1958.

Later life

She died at her home, Shanemullagh House, Castledawson, in the south of County Londonderry, on 28 November 1963, at age 81. She was interred two days later in the grounds of Christ Church, Castledawson.

References

1882 births
1963 deaths
Dames Commander of the Order of the British Empire
Dames Grand Cross of the Order of the British Empire
Ulster Unionist Party members of the House of Commons of Northern Ireland
Members of the House of Commons of Northern Ireland 1921–1925
Members of the House of Commons of Northern Ireland 1925–1929
Members of the House of Commons of Northern Ireland 1933–1938
Members of the House of Commons of Northern Ireland 1938–1945
Members of the House of Commons of Northern Ireland 1945–1949
Members of the House of Commons of Northern Ireland 1949–1953
Members of the House of Commons of Northern Ireland 1953–1958
Members of the House of Commons of Northern Ireland 1958–1962
Northern Ireland junior government ministers (Parliament of Northern Ireland)
Members of the Privy Council of Northern Ireland
Women members of the House of Commons of Northern Ireland
Politicians from Dehradun
Politicians from County Londonderry
Dehra
Members of the House of Commons of Northern Ireland for County Londonderry constituencies
Northern Ireland Cabinet ministers (Parliament of Northern Ireland)
Irish people in colonial India